About Canada was a Canadian television series featuring National Film Board films which aired on CBC Television from 1956 to 1957.

Premise
In its 1956 season, it aired Tuesdays at 6 p.m. from 14 February to 17 July 1956. That year's presentations included "Arctic Dog Team", "Blacksmith", "Caleche Driver", "Dick Hickey", "Longhouse People", "Men of Lunenberg and Windswept Isles", "Motorman", "The Newcomers", "Paul Tomkowicz - Street Railway Switchman", "People of the Skeena", "Peter and the Potter", "Salt from the Earth", "Shadow on the Prairies", "Story of Oil", "Taxi Driver", "Ti-Jean Goes Lumbering" and "Voices from Acadia".

The following year, About Canada aired Sundays at 1 p.m. from 12 May to 30 June. Films in that season included subjects such as the previous year's Royal visit, the forest industry, First Nations people, the Magdalen Islands and Newfoundland residents.

External links
 

CBC Television original programming
1950s Canadian documentary television series
1956 Canadian television series debuts
1957 Canadian television series endings
Black-and-white Canadian television shows
National Film Board of Canada documentary series